The 2020–21 Bangabandhu T20 Cup was a Twenty20 cricket competition that was held in Bangladesh. It was played by five teams, during November and December 2020. In November 2020, more than 100 players began to undertake fitness tests, ahead of a players' draft for the tournament. The players' draft took place on 12 November 2020, with the tournament starting in the third week of November. Two days later, the Bangladesh Cricket Board (BCB) confirmed the full schedule for the tournament.

The BCB originally announced that the tournament would be used for the criteria to select players for the Twenty20 International (T20I) matches against the West Indies, scheduled to be played in early 2021. However, in December 2020, the two cricket boards agreed the itinerary for the tour, with the T20I matches being dropped.

Gemcon Khulna won the tournament, beating Gazi Group Chattogram by five runs in the final.

Teams
The BCB confirmed that the following teams would take part:

 Beximco Dhaka
 Fortune Barishal
 Gazi Group Chattogram
 Gemcon Khulna
 Minister Group Rajshahi

Squads
The players' draft took place on 12 November 2020, with each team selecting a squad of sixteen players.

Points table

  advanced to the Qualifier 1
  advanced to the Eliminator

League stage

Playoffs

Final

References

External links
 Series home at ESPN Cricinfo

Bangladeshi domestic cricket competitions
Bangabandhu T20 Cup
2020 in Bangladeshi cricket
Bangladeshi cricket seasons from 2000–01